Karen McCormick is an American politician and veterinarian serving as a member of the Colorado House of Representatives from the 11th district. Elected in November 2020, she assumed office on January 13, 2021.

Education 
McCormick earned a Bachelor of Science degree in dairy science from the University of Florida and a Doctor of Veterinary Medicine from the University of Florida College of Veterinary Medicine.

Career 
McCormick owned and operated a veterinary clinic for 16 years. She has also worked as a communications coach at the Colorado State University Veterinary Teaching Hospital. In 2018, McCormick was the Democratic nominee for Colorado's 4th congressional district, losing to incumbent Republican Ken Buck. McCormick was elected to the Colorado House of Representatives in November 2020 and assumed office on January 13, 2021.

Personal life 
McCormick and her husband have three children and live in Longmont, Colorado.

References 

Living people
University of Florida alumni
People from Longmont, Colorado
Democratic Party members of the Colorado House of Representatives
Women state legislators in Colorado
Year of birth missing (living people)
21st-century American women